Long Spruce Generating Station is a run-of-the-river hydroelectric dam on the Nelson River approximately  northeast of Winnipeg in the Canadian province of Manitoba.   

It was Manitoba Hydro's fourth generating station to be built on the Nelson River, which flows from Lake Winnipeg to Hudson Bay. The station was built on Long Spruce Rapids.

The dam is owned and operated by Manitoba Hydro. The first concrete for the structures was placed in 1974, with first power delivered in 1977. The station was completed in 1979 at a cost of $CDN 508 million.

See also

 List of largest power stations in Canada
 Kettle Generating Station – upstream, completed in 1973
 Limestone Generating Station  – downstream, completed in 1990 
 Nelson River Hydroelectric Project

References

Energy infrastructure completed in 1977
Energy infrastructure completed in 1978
Hydroelectric power stations in Manitoba
Run-of-the-river power stations